is a Japanese professional golfer. She has won 15 tournaments internationally, including four on the U.S.-based LPGA Tour.

Professional career
Kobayashi turned pro in 1985. She won six titles on the LPGA of Japan Tour in 1989. In 1990, she joined the LPGA Tour and was named LPGA Rookie of the Year. She won four tournaments between 1993 and 1998. She also won one title on the Ladies European Tour, the Evian Masters in 1997.

Professional wins (15)

LPGA of Japan Tour (11)
1989 (6) Sky Court Ladies, Tohoku Queens, Mizuno Ladies Open, Japan Women's Open Golf Championship, Junon Women's Open, Daio Paper Elleair Women's Open
1991 (1) Itsuki Classic
1995 (2) Fujitsu Ladies, Kibun Women's Classic
1998 (1) Japan Classic (co-sanctioned by the LPGA Tour)
2002 (1) Daio Paper Elleair Ladies Open

Tournament in bold denotes major championships in LPGA of Japan Tour.

LPGA Tour (4)

LPGA Tour playoff record (3–1)

Ladies European Tour (1)
1997 (1) Evian Masters

Team appearances
Amateur
Espirito Santo Trophy (representing Japan): 1986

References

External links

Japanese female golfers
LPGA Tour golfers
LPGA of Japan Tour golfers
Sportspeople from Fukushima Prefecture
1963 births
Living people
20th-century Japanese women